L’Instant Durable is a French publishing and distribution company created in 1983 by Alain de Bussac. It is based in Clermont-Ferrand (France).

History
Result of a meeting between Paul de Boever, architect, and Alain de Bussac who was working in the graphic arts and industries, the publishing house L’Instant Durable continues in part the tradition of the construction of architectural models in paper  from printed sheets introduced by the Imagerie d’Épinal in the 19th century. L’Instant Durable has created the concept of the livre-maquette  (model-book) : the printed sheets to cut out are assembled in a book which includes an historic text on the monument to build. It is always translated into several languages. The authors are qualified architects and artists who use the latest reproduction techniques. All the monuments are represented at a similar scale (generally 1/250 or, more rarely, 1/500), which allows comparison between them.

In 1983, the collection Architecture et Modélisme is launched with the first title being on the Château de Chenonceau (architects P. De Boever and Bernard Deubelbeiss, texts A. de Bussac).

From 1984 onward, several titles appear each year in the model-book collection, each one requiring two years preparation. The publishing house gathers together new architects : Thierry Hatot, Jean-Marie Lemaire, Jean-Tristan Roquebert and new graphic artists and illustrators : Anne-Marie Piaulet, Pierre Guérin, Hughes Renier, Jacques Martin (creator of the comic book characters Alix and Enak).

In 1986, creation of a collection of postcard models to cut out representing world-famous monuments, with a definite predominance of European monuments, as well as historic statuettes. This collection includes more than 150 titles in its catalogue in 2009. In the same year a collection of die-cut model cards makes its debut.

In 1991, the new collection Grand Angle proposes models on more varied themes to complement the models consecrated to architecture.

In 1998, launching of Compas, a collection of books on art and architecture in the form of mini encyclopaedias with the collaboration of specialists such as François Taillandier (Grand Prix du roman de l'Académie française), Thierry Hatot (lauréat du Salon du Livre d'Architecture de Briey), Bénédicte Tézenas du Montcel, Alain Berghmans, Bernard Deubelbeiss.

In 2000 : L’Instant Durable secures the exclusive distribution of the Éditions Paléo, specialists in the publication of reference texts (from Antiquity to 20th century) in their integral version.

References

Bibliography
 Collective : Architecture à découper, Stichting Kunstprojecten, Rotterdam, 1987,

External links
 Homepage of L'Instant Durable (fr+en)

Book publishing companies of France
Mass media in Clermont-Ferrand